Sibylle Lewitscharoff (born 16 April 1954) is a German author. Among her novels are Pong (1998), Apostoloff (2009) and Blumenberg (2011). She has received several German literary awards, including the Georg Büchner Prize in 2013.

Early life
Lewitscharoff was born and grew up in Stuttgart with a father who was a doctor of Bulgarian origin and a German mother. Her father committed suicide when she was nine years old.

After obtaining a degree in religious studies at the Free University of Berlin she lived in Buenos Aires and Paris before returning to Berlin where she worked as a book-keeper. She ended that work in 2000.

Literary career
Lewitscharoff started her writing career by writing for radio, including radio plays.

Her first book 36 Gerechte was published in 1994.

In 1998, she published her first novel Pong The novel is named after its main character; a man who has been interpreted by reviewers as possibly being insane, and possibly not being fully human. He has his name for his ability to bounce like a ball; something that is connected to his birth from one big tear. He is obsessed with human perfection, especially that of women, and is portrayed as a misogynist. He finds a woman called Evmarie whom he eventually marries. He puts her on a roof top to hold her hands over two eggs which ultimately will become a boy and a girl and soon get their own offspring. The book ends with Pong's joyous cry as he is committing suicide through jumping from the roof. The book was praised for its playful language and earned Lewitscharoff the  Ingeborg Bachmann Prize

Published in 2006, the novel Consummatus has its title from the last words of Jesus on the cross according to the Gospel of John, consummatum est (it is completed). The main character is German teacher Ralph Zimmermann and the book follows his inner monologue as he sits alone one Saturday in a Stuttgart café drinking vodka and coffee. His thoughts circle much around death; both of his parents in an accident, of his girlfriend Johanna (Joey), as well as pop icons such as Andy Warhol, Jim Morrison and Edie Sedgwick.

Her 2009 novel Apostoloff has a partly self-biographical theme and features two sisters who go to Bulgaria to bury their Bulgarian immigrant father who has committed suicide through hanging himself. Their chauffeur Ruben Apostoloff tries to make them enthusiastic about the nature and culture of Bulgaria. The book earned Lewitscharoff the Leipzig Book Fair Prize and the Marie Luise Kaschnitz Prize.

The novel Blumenberg was published in 2011 and features the philosopher Hans Blumenberg who in the novel one evening finds a lion at his desk; and the book subsequently focuses on Blumberg's thoughts on lions in philosophy, history and theology. Lines are drawn to Hieronymus, Marc, Thomas Mann and other historical figures relationship to the lion. The appearance of the lion makes Blumenberg feel selected. The novel also tells about four of Blumenberg's students.

In 2013 she received the Georg Büchner Prize for "[re-exploring] the boundaries of what we consider our daily reality with an inexhaustible energy of observation, narrative fantasy and linguistic inventiveness".

In 2014, she published her first crime novel, Killmousky. The novel is named after a black cat that one evening arrives at the home of Richard Ellwanger, a retired police officer who names the cat after a similar cat in Midsomer Murders. The police officer has retired after he used violence against a suspect in a kidnapping case in order to get information to find the kidnapped. He goes on to take a position as private detective for a person in New York's upper class who wants a possible murder solved. The book received mostly mixed reviews.

Lewitscharoff has received praise for her playful mastery of language, described by the jury of the Berlin Literature Prize in 2010 as "uncommonly dense and original prose works ... that oppose all classifications with their own peculiar amalgam of humor and profundity. ... Lewitscharoff's poetic gesture is a brilliant recitative, a virtuoso rhetoric". In 2011, she was described in Die Welt as "the most dazzling stylist of contemporary German literature."

Literature expert Ulrike Veder puts Lewitscharoff in the magical realism tradition and has further expressed on Lewitscharoff's writing that "it's the constellation of profound knowledge and a writing style that is funny and headstrong and that not only plays with language but actually enriches the language".

Invited to write about her favourite authors, she wrote the essay Dichter als Kind''' which included Johann Wolfgang von Goethe, Friedrich Schiller, Gottfried Keller, Karl Philipp Moritz,  Clemens Brentano and Bettina Brentano. She has cited Clemens Brentano as her absolute favourite.

Dresden speech
On 2 March 2014, Lewitscharoff held the traditional Dresdner Reden (Dresden Speech) in Dresden Staatsschauspiel. In the speech "Von der Machbarkeit. Die wissenschaftliche Bestimmung über Geburt und Tod" she criticized what she considered medical mechanization of reproduction and death. She voiced opposition to artificial insemination and surrogacy referring to the offspring through such methods as "twilight creatures", "half human, half artificial I-don't-know-whats". The speech caused discussion and criticism. Lewitscharoff later said she regretted a couple of phrases, but that her main points stood.

Personal life
Lewitscharoff lives in Berlin with her husband, artist Friedrich Meckseper. She is a scholar at the Villa Massimo.

She has a religious faith which she says was invoked by her maternal grandmother, who lived with the family when she was a child. While a Lutheran, she is influenced by the Catholic tradition on many moral issues.

Awards and recognition (selected)
 Ingeborg Bachmann Prize (1998)
 Member of Deutsche Akademie für Sprache und Dichtung (2007)
 Marie Luise Kaschnitz Prize (2008)
 Leipzig Book Fair Prize (2009)
 Ricarda-Huch-Preis (2011)
 Marieluise-Fleißer-Preis (2011)
 Wilhelm Raabe Literature Prize (2011)
 Georg Büchner Prize (2013)
 Brothers Grimm guest professor at University of Kassel (2013)

Novels
 36 Gerechte. Steinrötter, Münster 1994, .
 Pong. Berlin Verlag, Berlin 1998, .
 Der höfliche Harald. Berlin Verlag, Berlin 1999, .
 Montgomery. DVA, Stuttgart / München 2003, .
 Consummatus. DVA, Stuttgart 2006, .
 Apostoloff. Suhrkamp, Frankfurt am Main 2009, .
 Blumenberg. Suhrkamp, Berlin 2011, ; als TB: Suhrkamp-Taschenbuch 4399, Berlin 2013, .
 With Friedrich Meckseper: Pong redivivus. Insel, Berlin 2013, .
 Killmousky''. Suhrkamp, Berlin 2014, .

References

External links

Living people
1954 births
20th-century German writers
21st-century German writers
20th-century German women writers
21st-century German women writers
Georg Büchner Prize winners
Kleist Prize winners
Members of the Academy of Arts, Berlin
German people of Bulgarian descent